The women's 4 x 100 metres relay at the 1938 European Athletics Championships was held in Vienna, at the time part of German Reich, at Praterstadion on 18 September 1938.

Medalists

Results

Final
18 September

Participation
According to an unofficial count, 24 athletes from 6 countries participated in the event.  The fourth member of the Norwegian relay team is unknown.

 (4)
 (4)
 (4)
 (4)
 (4)
 (4)

References

4 x 100 metres relay
Relays at the European Athletics Championships
Euro